NASCAR Heat is a 2000 racing video game for the PlayStation, Microsoft Windows and Game Boy Color. It was developed by Monster Games and published by Hasbro Interactive. The PlayStation version was co-developed with Digital Illusions CE.

Reception

The PC version received "favorable" reviews, while the PlayStation version received "mixed" reviews, according to the review aggregation website Metacritic.

The PC version was nominated for the Racing award at Computer Gaming Worlds 2001 Premier Awards, which went to Motocross Madness 2.

References

External links
 

2000 video games
Digital Illusions CE games
Game Boy Color games
Majesco Entertainment games
NASCAR video games
PlayStation (console) games
Video games developed in the United States
Video games scored by Olof Gustafsson
Windows games
Multiplayer and single-player video games
Pipe Dream Interactive games
Monster Games games